Cyperus unifolius is a species of sedge that is native to some islands in the Caribbean.

The species was first formally described by the botanist Johann Otto Boeckeler in 1870.

See also 
 List of Cyperus species

References 

unifolius
Taxa named by Johann Otto Boeckeler
Plants described in 1870
Flora of Puerto Rico
Flora of the Leeward Islands
Flora without expected TNC conservation status